Ri Kwang-chon (born 4 September 1985) is a former North Korean footballer who played as a centre-back.

Club career
From 2005 to 2011, Ri played for April 25 and helped them win the league three times in 2002, 2010 and 2011. In 2012, he had a chance to join Chinese side Tianjin Teda but had problems obtaining a work permit and eventually joined Muangthong United in Thailand. After his release from Muangthong, Ri returned to April 25 in 2014, but came back to Thailand a year later to join Pattaya United, retiring that same year. As with many other North Korean footballers, his whereabouts are unknown after his retirement.

International career
Ri played for the North Korean national team between 2001 and 2012. He represented the country at the 2010 FIFA World Cup and the 2011 AFC Asian Cup.

Honours

Club
April 25
 DPR Korea League: 2010, 2011

Muangthong United
 Thai Premier League: 2012

International
 AFC Challenge Cup: 2010, 2012

References

1985 births
Living people
North Korean footballers
North Korea international footballers
April 25 Sports Club players
2010 FIFA World Cup players
Expatriate footballers in Thailand
2011 AFC Asian Cup players
Association football central defenders
Footballers at the 2010 Asian Games
Asian Games competitors for North Korea
North Korean expatriate sportspeople in Thailand